Evans Landing was an unincorporated community in Taylor Township, Harrison County, Indiana, in the United States.

History
Evans Landing contained a post office from 1870 until 1947. William M. Evans served as an early postmaster. The community was washed away in 1937, leaving a single residence.

References

Unincorporated communities in Harrison County, Indiana
Unincorporated communities in Indiana